Crooked River is a 1950 American Western film directed by Thomas Carr and starring James Ellison and Russell Hayden.

It was also known as Hostile Country.

Plot
An outgoing outlaw (Russ Hayden) helps a man (Jimmy Ellison) track down the bandits who killed his parents.

Cast
 James Ellison as Shamrock Ellison (as Jimmie 'Shamrock' Ellison)
 Russell Hayden as Lucky Hayden (as Russ 'Lucky' Hayden)
 Raymond Hatton as Colonel
 Fuzzy Knight as Deacon
 Julie Adams as Ann Hayden (as Betty Adams)
 Tom Tyler as Weston - Henchman 
 George J. Lewis as Deke Gentry (as George Lewis)
 John Cason as Kent
 Stanley Price as Sheriff
 Stephen Carr as Butch Henchman
 Dennis Moore as Bob - Henchman
 George Chesebro as Dad Ellison
 Bud Osborne as Bud - Stage Driver
 Jimmy Martin as Henchman (as Jimmie Martin)

External links

Crooked River at TCMDB

1950 films
American Western (genre) films
1950s English-language films
1950 Western (genre) films
Lippert Pictures films
American black-and-white films
1950s American films